The men's Greco-Roman 54 kilograms is a competition featured at the 1997 World Wrestling Championships, and was held in Wrocław, Poland from 10 to 12 September 1997.

Results

Round 1

Round 2

Round 3

Round 4

Round 5

Round 6

Round 7

Finals

References

External links
UWW Database

Men's Greco-Roman 54 kg